(See "Torra di l'Isula di Gargali")
The Torra di Cargali is a tower in Corsica.

Notes and references

Towers in Corsica